Khaled Al-Maghrabi (born 11 September 1992) is a Saudi Arabian football player who currently plays as a right back for Al-Okhdood.

References

External links
 

Living people
1992 births
Association football defenders
Saudi Arabian footballers
Al-Qadsiah FC players
Al-Nahda Club (Saudi Arabia) players
Damac FC players
Al-Tai FC players
Al-Sahel SC (Saudi Arabia) players
Al-Bukayriyah FC players
Al-Kawkab FC players
Al-Okhdood Club players
Place of birth missing (living people)
Saudi First Division League players
Saudi Professional League players